Ángel Gorordo (6 March 1904 – 12 June 1974) was an Argentine fencer. He competed in the individual and team foil events at the 1932 and 1936 Summer Olympics.

References

1904 births
1974 deaths
Argentine male fencers
Olympic fencers of Argentina
Fencers at the 1932 Summer Olympics
Fencers at the 1936 Summer Olympics
Fencers from Buenos Aires
20th-century Argentine people